The  is a freight-only railway line owned and operated by the Kinuura Rinkai Railway in Handa, Aichi, Japan, since 1975. The line extends  from Higashi-Narawa Station (on the JR Central Taketoyo Line) to the terminal at Handa-Futō ("Handa Wharf").

Operations
Freight services over the Kinuura Rinkai Railway tracks are hauled by Class KE65 diesel locomotives. As of 2013, traffic on the line consisted of one return container service daily.

History
The line opened on 15 November 1975.

See also
 Kinuura Rinkai Railway Hekinan Line, the other line operated by the Kinuura Rinkai Railway
 List of railway lines in Japan

References

Rail transport in Aichi Prefecture
Railway lines opened in 1975
1975 establishments in Japan
1067 mm gauge railways in Japan